Tambiama is a town in Sierra Leone.

Populated places in Sierra Leone
Northern Province, Sierra Leone